An equestrian statue of Simón Bolívar, sometimes called the Simón Bolívar Monument, is installed in Manhattan's Central Park, in the U.S. state of New York. The memorial features a bronze sculpture by Sally James Farnham resting on a black granite pedestal designed by the firm Clarke and Rapuano. It was cast in 1919, dedicated on April 19, 1921, rededicated on April 19, 1951, and conserved by the Adopt-a-Monument Program in 1988.

See also

 1919 in art

References

External links
 

1919 sculptures
1921 establishments in New York City
Bronze sculptures in Central Park
Equestrian statues in New York City
Granite sculptures in New York City
Monuments and memorials in Manhattan
Outdoor sculptures in Manhattan
Sculptures in Central Park
Sculptures of men in New York City
Statues of Simón Bolívar in the United States